Cosmin Nicolae Băcilă (born 10 September 1983) is a Romanian former professional footballer. On 18 September 2011, Băcilă suffered a broken left tibia and fibula following a tackle by Florin Gardoș in a match between Pandurii and Steaua București. He underwent surgery at Spitalul Universitar de Urgenţă Elias in Bucharest, on 20 September, and was released from the hospital three days later.

Honours

Club
Pandurii
Liga I (1): runner-up 2013

References

External links
 
 

People from Brașov County
1983 births
Living people
Romanian footballers
Association football midfielders
Liga I players
Liga II players
FCV Farul Constanța players
FC Internațional Curtea de Argeș players
CS Pandurii Târgu Jiu players
ASA 2013 Târgu Mureș players